Mary Ellen McCaffree (February 25, 1918 – June 24, 2014) was an American politician who served in the Washington House of Representatives from the 32nd district from 1963 to 1971.

She died on June 24, 2014, in Snohomish, Washington at age 96.

References

1918 births
2014 deaths
Republican Party members of the Washington House of Representatives
Women state legislators in Washington (state)